The following highways are numbered 508:

United States